Houldsworth Mill, also known as Reddish Mill, is a former mill in Reddish, Stockport, Greater Manchester, England. Designed by Abraham Stott, it was constructed in 1865 for Henry Houldsworth, a prominent mill owner at the time. It is a Grade II* listed building.

History

Reddish mill was built by Stott and Sons for William Houldsworth, and opened in 1865.

In 1898, it amalgamated with the Fine Cotton Spinners Association. The mill had 136,692 spindles and at one time spun counts of 700 and 800, but normally 80s to 250s.

After cotton
Cotton production at Houldsworth Mill ceased in the 1950s. The mill was sold to a mail-order catalogue company, John Myers, and was used principally as a warehouse. In the late 1960s the building was expanded with a five-storey extension to the rear of the north end of the mill. This was built of glass and concrete in the style of the period.

Mail-order trading ceased in the 1970s, and the mill was sold. It was divided into separate business units, but most of the building remained vacant and it fell into a state of disrepair.

Architecture
The 1865 mill consists of two five-storeyed blocks of 18 bays, with a narrower 9 bay central block for warehousing and offices. The central block has two Italianate stair towers and carries a central clock. The floors have become wider to accommodate the larger mules of the period. All floors are fireproof, with transverse vaults.

The detached engine house used horizontal shafts that connected to vertical shafts in each spinning block. The chimney  was octagonal, on a plinth with a highly embellished oversailer. In the early 20th century this was replaced with separate inverted compound engines for each block, with external rope races for rope drives.

Restoration
The pilot study for restoration was part-funded by English Heritage. The refurbishment was funded by:

 The mill's owners (Heaton and Houldsworth Property Company)
 Northern Counties Housing Association (and Housing Corporation)
 English Partnerships
 European Regional Development Fund
 Stockport Council
 Various anchor tenants, including Ridge Danyers College and Kingfisher Pools

This mill was converted by Stephenson Bell architects. It provides 70 shared ownership apartments for social housing provider Northern Counties Housing Association, start-up units for emerging high-technology and arts-based businesses with commercial and leisure uses at the lower floors to provide active frontages.

See also

 Units of textile measurement#Thread count
 Fine Spinners and Doublers, former cotton-spinning business in Manchester, once in FT 30 index 
 Grade II* listed buildings in Greater Manchester
 Listed buildings in Stockport
 List of mills in Stockport
 Broadstone Mill, Reddish

References
Notes

Bibliography

External links

 www.cottontown.org
 www.spinningtheweb.org.uk
 Houldsworth Village

Cotton industry in England
Textile mills in the Metropolitan Borough of Stockport
Industrial buildings completed in 1865
Grade II* listed buildings in Greater Manchester
1865 establishments in England